is a former Japanese football player and manager. He played for Japan national team.

Club career
Kato was born in Rifu, Miyagi on April 24, 1956. After graduating from Waseda University, after a year's blank, he joined Yomiuri (later Verdy Kawasaki) in 1980. The club won the champions in Japan Soccer League 5 times, JSL Cup 2 times and Emperor's Cup 3 times. This was golden era in club history. In 1992, Japan Soccer League was folded and founded new league J1 League. The club won 1992 J.League Cup. J1 League first season in 1993, although he played in opening match, he lost opportunity to play after that. So, he moved to Shimizu S-Pulse in July. In July 1994, he returned to Verdy Kawasaki. The club won J1 League and retired end of 1994 season. He was 38 years old. He played 243 games and scored 11 goals in the league. He was selected Best Eleven 9 times.

National team career
On November 19, 1978, when Kato was a Waseda University student, he debuted for Japan national team against Soviet Union. He played at 1978 and 1982 Asian Games. From 1984, he served as captain and played at 1984 Summer Olympics qualification, 1986 World Cup qualification, 1986 Asian Games and 1988 Summer Olympics qualification. At 1988 Olympics qualification in 1987, Japan failed to qualify for 1988 Summer Olympics and he retired from national team. He played 61 games and scored 6 goals for Japan until 1987.

Coaching career
After retirement, Kato became a manager for Verdy Kawasaki in 1997. But he resigned in July. In 2000, he signed with J2 League club Shonan Bellmare. However the club finished 8th place, he was sacked end of 2000 season. In 2007, he signed with J2 club Kyoto Sanga FC and became a general manager. However he sacked manager Naohiko Minobe and Kato became new manager in October. He led the club to won 3rd place in 2007 and promoted to J1 League. In July 2010, he was sacked.

In 2018, Kato was selected Japan Football Hall of Fame.

Club statistics

National team statistics

Managerial statistics

Awards
 Japan Soccer League Best Eleven (9): 1981, 1982, 1983, 1984, 1985-86, 1986-87, 1987-88, 1990-91, 1991-92

References

External links
 
 
 
 
 Japan Football Hall of Fame at Japan Football Association
 Japan National Football Team Database

1956 births
Living people
Waseda University alumni
Association football people from Miyagi Prefecture
Japanese footballers
Japan international footballers
Japan Soccer League players
J1 League players
Tokyo Verdy players
Shimizu S-Pulse players
Association football defenders
Japanese football managers
J1 League managers
J2 League managers
Tokyo Verdy managers
Shonan Bellmare managers
Kyoto Sanga FC managers
Footballers at the 1978 Asian Games
Footballers at the 1982 Asian Games
Footballers at the 1986 Asian Games
Asian Games competitors for Japan